Stenhouse Peak is a peak, 525 m, standing 1 nautical mile (1.9 km) west of Maiviken, Cumberland Bay, on the north coast of South Georgia. The name appears to be first used on a 1929 British Admiralty chart.

Mountains and hills of South Georgia